Sabina Samad gizi Khasayeva (née Suleymanova; born 30 March 1993) is an Azerbaijani politician who has been a member of the National Assembly since 2020. She was the youngest MP elected at the 2020 Azerbaijani parliamentary election.

References 

Living people
1993 births
21st-century Azerbaijani women politicians
21st-century Azerbaijani politicians
Women members of the National Assembly (Azerbaijan)
Members of the National Assembly (Azerbaijan)
New Azerbaijan Party politicians
Members of the 6th convocation of the National Assembly (Azerbaijan)